Byalynichy is a city and administrative center of Byalynichy District of Mogilev Region in Belarus.

Among other things, the town is known for the icon Our Lady of Byalynichy, venerated by both Eastern Orthodox, Greek Catholic and Roman Catholic Christians of Belarus.

History
Around 780 Jews lived in Byalynichy at the eve of World War II. They composed about 24 percent of the total population. The Jews were mainly traders.

Byalynichy was under German occupation from 6 July 1941 until 29 June 1944. There were different execution sites of the Byalynichy Jews. The main one is in the forest: more than 600 Jews (mainly women and children) from the Byalynichy ghetto were shot in two large pits on December 12, 1941. The graves were dug by the inhabitants of the nearby village, Mashchanitsa. The Jewish men were killed during a previous Aktion in September 1941 near Niropla. After the first murder operation conducted in August or September 1941, the remaining Jews of Byalynichy, as well as refugees from Poland who had arrived in 1939 and 1940 — about 600 people in all, were concentrated in a ghetto established on a single street. Later Jews from the neighboring localities of Shepelevichi, Golovchin, Neroplya, and others were deported to the ghetto.
Belarusian police were posted as guards. The Jews in the ghetto were killed on December 12, 1941.

The Red Army liberated Byalynichy on June 29, 1944

References

External links
 The murder of the Jews of Byalynichy during World War II, at Yad Vashem website.

Urban-type settlements in Belarus
Populated places in Mogilev Region
Byalynichy District
Mogilyovsky Uyezd (Mogilev Governorate)
Holocaust locations in Belarus